Adelsohn is a surname. Notable people with the surname include:

Lena Adelsohn Liljeroth (born 1955), Swedish politician, wife of Ulf
Ulf Adelsohn (born 1941), Swedish politician

See also
Adelson